Tingena siderodeta is a species of moth in the family Oecophoridae. It is endemic to New Zealand and is found throughout the country. This species prefers to inhabit native forest and scrubland but has also been found to be common in cultivated landscapes. The larvae are litter feeders and have been observed in Kanuka and Manuka forest. The adult moths are on the wing from October to February and are day flying but have also been trapped at night.

Taxonomy
This species was first described by Edward Meyrick in 1883 using specimens collected at Christchurch, Dunedin and Lake Wakatipu during December to February and named  Oecophora siderodeta. Meyrick went on to give a more detailed description in 1884. In 1915 Meyrick placed this species within the Borkhausenia genus. In 1926 Alfred Philpott studied and illustrated the genitalia of the male of this species. George Hudson discussed and illustrated this species under the name B. phegophylla in his 1928 publication The butterflies and moths of New Zealand. In 1988 Dugdale placed this species in the genus Tingena. The male lectotype, collected in Christchurch, is held at the Natural History Museum, London.

Description 

Meyrick first described this species as follows:

Meyrick, in his more detailed description, stated:
Philpott stated that specimens of this species collected in Stewart Island / Rakiura are larger than those from other locations.

Distribution

This species is endemic to New Zealand and is found throughout the country. This species has also been found in a site of ecological significance in Christchurch as set out in the Christchurch District Plan.

Behaviour 
Adults of this species are on the wing from October until February. It can be found flying in daylight hours and has been collected when resting on fence posts or tree trunks. This species has also been collected at night via a Malaise trap. When idle this species resembles a small pointed twig as its body position ensures its antennae are held backwards, the wings encircle the body and the rear end of the insect is lifted with the head lowered.

Habitat 
This species can be found in cultivated landscapes and prefers open clearings. The larvae of this species are leaf litter feeders in scrubland and native forest and have been found in Kanuka and Manuka stands.

References

Oecophoridae
Moths of New Zealand
Moths described in 1883
Endemic fauna of New Zealand
Taxa named by Edward Meyrick
Endemic moths of New Zealand